Blue Berets is a musical group, part of the Russian Federation Ministry of Defence as part of Song and Dance Ensemble of the airborne troops of Russia.

History
In August 1985, the ensemble was born in the storeroom of 2nd Company of the 1st Battalion of the 350th Regiment. It was founded by Sergey Isakov, Igor Ivanchenko and company foreman  Oleg Gontsov. In November they were joined by Sergey Yarovoy. The first concert took place in Afghanistan, on the evening of 19 November 1985 for the 350th Guards Airborne Regiment.

The only ensemble in the Armed Forces of Russia, where all participants are Honored Artist of the Russian Federation.

Members 
The head of the ensemble was Komsomol Committee secretary regiment captain Sergey Yarovoy The other members were Company Sergeant 350th RAP Ensign Oleg Gontsov, squad leader Sergeant Sergei Isakov, Mechanic - driver Private Igor Ivanchenko and soldier Tarikh Lyssov.

History 
From November 1985 to February 1987, the band performed for many parts of the Soviet forces in the Republic of Afghanistan, the Soviet Embassy, sales office, offices of the Afghan Interior Ministry and the KGB, and the Polytechnic Institute of Kabul.

In 1988 - the ensemble was situated near Moscow in a military camp of the 171st Airborne Brigade separate communication (now 38-th Guards separate communications regiment) in the village. Bear Lakes, while remaining amateur.

References

External links
 
 Дискография
 «Голубые береты» Учительская газета, 2006 г.
 Сайт друзей ансамбля
 Песней наполняют парашюты

Soviet musical groups
Russian musical groups
Airborne units and formations of Russia
Musical groups established in 1985
Musical groups from Moscow
Russian military bands
1985 establishments in the Soviet Union